Lukáš Mareček (born 17 April 1990) is a Czech footballer who plays for Teplice. He is member of the Czech under-21 team. He represented the team at the 2011 UEFA European Under-21 Football Championship.

Career
On 26 January 2010, Mareček signed for R.S.C. Anderlecht from FC Zbrojovka Brno until June 2014. On 29 August 2012, he was sent on loan to SC Heerenveen for one season.

References

External links
 
 
 

1990 births
Living people
People from Ivančice
Association football defenders
Association football midfielders
Czech footballers
Czech Republic youth international footballers
Czech Republic under-21 international footballers
Czech Republic international footballers
Czech First League players
FC Zbrojovka Brno players
R.S.C. Anderlecht players
SC Heerenveen players
AC Sparta Prague players
K.S.C. Lokeren Oost-Vlaanderen players
Belgian Pro League players
Eredivisie players
Czech expatriate footballers
Expatriate footballers in Belgium
Expatriate footballers in the Netherlands
Czech expatriate sportspeople in Belgium
FK Teplice players
Sportspeople from the South Moravian Region